William Mathews (born 23 March 1793 at Crondall, Hampshire; died 20 August 1858 at Woodbridge, Suffolk) was an English professional cricketer who played first-class cricket from 1821 to 1830. He was mainly associated with Surrey and made 31 known appearances in first-class matches.

Mathews took part in the Gentlemen v Players matches between 1824 and 1830, usually representing the Players, but in 1825, he was a given man for the Gentlemen. He played for All-England in the 1827 roundarm trial matches and was one of the signatories to the petition after the second game that called upon the authorities to ban roundarm.

References

External links

Bibliography
 H S Altham, A History of Cricket, Volume 1 (to 1914), George Allen & Unwin, 1926
 Arthur Haygarth, Scores & Biographies, Volumes 1-2 (1744–1840), Lillywhite, 1862

1793 births
1858 deaths
English cricketers
English cricketers of 1787 to 1825
English cricketers of 1826 to 1863
Surrey cricketers
Players cricketers
Suffolk cricketers
Hampshire cricketers
Left-Handed v Right-Handed cricketers
Married v Single cricketers
Gentlemen cricketers
Godalming Cricket Club cricketers